The Chilliwack Chiefs were a Junior "A" ice hockey team from Chilliwack, British Columbia, Canada.  They were a part of the British Columbia Hockey League and played in the Mainland Division/Coastal Conference.

The BCHL franchise was founded as the Richmond Sockeyes in 1972 in the Pacific Junior A Hockey League. In 1990, Sockeyes returned to the junior B level and sold the franchise to become the Chilliwack Chiefs. Chilliwack previously had teams such as the Chilliwack Bruins from 1970 until 1976, who moved to Maple Ridge, British Columbia, and the Chilliwack Colts from 1978 until 1981 who seem to have become the Langley Eagles and later the Chilliwack Eagles from 1987 until 1989.

Following the expansion of the Western Hockey League into Chilliwack with the Chilliwack Bruins, the franchise was sold and moved to Langley, where they became the Langley Chiefs. The former owners retained ownership of the Chiefs name and, in 2011, the Chiefs Development Group purchased the Quesnel Millionaires, which debuted as the Chilliwack Chiefs in the 2011–12 season.

Season-by-season record
Note: GP = Games Played, W = Wins, L = Losses, T = Ties, OTL = Overtime Losses, GF = Goals for, GA = Goals against

NHL alumni

See also
Chilliwack Bruins (BCJHL)
Langley Rivermen
Chilliwack Bruins
List of ice hockey teams in British Columbia

External links
Chilliwack Chiefs Website

Defunct British Columbia Hockey League teams
Sport in Chilliwack
1990 establishments in British Columbia
2006 disestablishments in British Columbia
Ice hockey clubs established in 1990
Ice hockey clubs disestablished in 2006